David Kirk (born 1961) is a rugby union footballer.

David Kirk may also refer to:
 David Kirk (author), children's book author
 David Kirk (activist) (1935–2007), civil rights activist and Eastern Orthodox cleric
 David Kirk (scientist), Chief Scientist of NVIDIA Corporation
 David Kirk (sociologist), American sociologist

See also
David Kirke (c. 1597–1654), adventurer and colonizer